Soner Dikmen (born 1 September 1993) is a Turkish professional footballer who plays as a midfielder for Konyaspor in the Turkish Süper Lig.

Professional career
Dikmen made his professional debut for Gençlerbirliği in a 4-0 Süper Lig loss to Gazişehir Gaziantep F.K. on 26 August 2019.

References

External links
 
 
 

1993 births
Living people
People from Altındağ, Ankara
Turkish footballers
Gençlerbirliği S.K. footballers
Göztepe S.K. footballers
Hacettepe S.K. footballers
Süper Lig players
TFF First League players
Association football midfielders